Ober da Bakod 2 (Da Treasure Adbentyur) is a 1996 Philippine comedy film directed by Ariel Ureta. The film stars Janno Gibbs, Anjo Yllana, Leo Martinez, Manilyn Reynes, Donita Rose, Gelli de Belen and Malou de Guzman. It is a sequel to the 1994 movie of the same title.

Plot
After landing in hospital after a series of mishaps, Mokong and Don Robert receive a map from a dying patient containing clues towards a cure-all medicine that could make them rich. The convince their respective families to accompany them in finding it. They arrive separately in a run-down laboratory run by mad scientist Hannibal, who captures them all except for Mokong and Kuting and electrocutes them into insanity. Mokong and Kuting later restore their minds and defeat Hannibal before rescuing Dr. No, a scientist who leads them to the next clue, located in a bank that is being robbed while Don Robert's daughter Kasoy, who initially chose not to join the treasure hunt, is inside. After Mokong and Don Robert foil the robbers, the grateful bank managers give them their next clue, which leads them to the mansion of a Beast who falls in love with Barbie. The Beast is transformed back into human form by Barbie's love, but is killed by his aide out of jealousy, after which the mansion collapses, but not before the Beast reveals that the next clue is in the Moon. Upon their unexplained arrival in the Moon, they meet a tribe composed of women, whose leader explains that the medicine they are searching for is located in a giant, animated flower. However, none of the party get to enjoy the fruits of their quest, as the tribe are decimated by carnivorous aliens while Don Robert is mauled by the flower after he gets too much of its stamen. Mokong, Don Robert and their families are then rescued by relatives on a spaceship and return to Earth, but Don Robert is ejected into space by Mokong when he tries to stop his romance with Kasoy. While floating in space, Don Robert is arrested by police.

Cast
Janno Gibbs as Mokong
Anjo Yllana as Bubuli
Leo Martinez as Don Robert
Manilyn Reynes as Kasoy
Donita Rose as Barbie Doll
Angelu de Leon as Kuting
Malou de Guzman as Lucring
Arnel Ignacio as Desi
Gary Estrada as Beast
Amanda Page as Moonwoman leader
Ruel Vernal as Hannibal
Errol Dionisio as Utu
Jon Achaval as Dr. No
Raffy Rodriguez as Kargador
Nikka Cruz as Ay-Ay
Christopher de Venecia as Dagul
Jayboy Samson as Richard
Chi Fier as Chi
Jose Balagtas as bank holdupper head

Production
The film was supposed to be part of the 1995 Metro Manila Film Festival, but was not able to make it to the cut-off. Its playdate was set to late January 1996.

References

External links

1996 films
1996 comedy films
Filipino-language films
Films based on television series
GMA Pictures films
Neo Films films
Philippine comedy films